The State Museum of Natural History Karlsruhe, abbreviated SMNK, is one of the two state of Baden-Württemberg's natural history museums. Together with the State Museum of Natural History Stuttgart (Staatliches Museum für Naturkunde Stuttgart) it is one of the most important repositories for state-owned natural history collections.

It is well known for its exhibitions on all aspects of natural history in the city of Karlsruhe and beyond. Every year, the SMNK is visited by about 150,000 people.

Research at the museum mainly deals with various fields of natural history i.e. geology, paleontology, taxonomy, biogeography, and ecology. The SMNK is part of the national networks German Natural History Research Collections (DNFS), the Humboldt-Ring (Association of Research Museums) and of the International Council of Museums (ICOM).

The SMNK looks back at a long history as it emerged from the cabinet of natural history of Landgravine Caroline Louise of Hesse-Darmstadt during the mid 18th century.

Controversy

The museum has been criticized for unethical and possibly illegal appropriation of fossils. The fossil of Ubirajara jubatus, a unique dinosaur from the Cretaceous period with structures that might be early feathers, was exported from Brazil in 1995 with a permit for unspecified specimens, so the document cannot be directly linked to the Ubirajara fossil. In addition, Brazilian law does not allow permanent exports of fossils, only loans. The Brazilian Society of Paleontology announced it would investigate the issue, and several Brazilian paleontologists want the fossil to be returned. The paper describing the fossil, authored by a researcher of the museum, has been temporarily removed. Other fossils in the museum, such as belonging to Unwindia and Susisuchus, face similar ethical concerns.

See also 
List of museums in Germany
List of natural history museums

References

External links 

  

Museums in Baden-Württemberg
Karlsruhe
Buildings and structures in Karlsruhe
Tourist attractions in Karlsruhe